Irvin Barraclough (born 25 April 1927 – 2007) was an English professional rugby league footballer who played in the 1940s and 1950s. He played at club level for Featherstone Rovers (Heritage № 220), Oldham (Heritage № 517), Castleford (Heritage № 327) and Doncaster (Heritage № 43), as a goal-kicking , i.e. number 1.

Background
Irvin Barraclough was born in Ackworth, Wakefield, West Riding of Yorkshire, England, his birth was registered in Hemsworth district, West Riding of Yorkshire, after his rugby league playing career, he worked as the Deputy Head Groundsman, and then Head Groundsman at the University of Leeds Athletics Grounds at Weetwood, Leeds until he retired, he died aged 80 in Leeds, West Yorkshire, England.

Playing career
Irvin Barraclough made his début for Featherstone Rovers (aged 16-years 9-months and 11-days) on Saturday 5 February 1944, he played his last match for Featherstone Rovers during the 1947–48 season, he was transferred from Featherstone Rovers to Oldham, he was transferred from Oldham to Castleford, he made his début for Castleford during the 1950–51 season, during his time at Castleford he scored two 2-point drop goals, he played his last match for Castleford during the 1953–54 Northern Rugby Football League season, and he was transferred from Castleford to Doncaster, he appears to have scored no drop-goals (or field-goals as they are currently known in Australasia), but prior to the 1974–75 season all goals, whether; conversions, penalties, or drop-goals, scored 2-points, consequently prior to this date drop-goals were often not explicitly documented, therefore '0' drop-goals may indicate drop-goals not recorded, rather than no drop-goals scored.

Genealogical information
Irvin Barraclough's marriage to Joyce M. (née James) was registered during third ¼ 1953 in Hemsworth district. They had children; Steven Barraclough (birth registered during second ¼  in Hemsworth district), Jill Barraclough (birth registered during third ¼  in Leeds district) and Ralph Barraclough (birth registered during first ¼  in Leeds district).

Note

References

External links
Search for "Barraclough" at rugbyleagueproject.org
Statistics at orl-heritagetrust.org.uk
Barraclough Memory Box Search at archive.castigersheritage.com
Irvin Barraclough Memory Box Search at archive.castigersheritage.com
Irvine Barraclough Memory Box Search at archive.castigersheritage.com
Irving Barraclough Memory Box Search at archive.castigersheritage.com
Search for "Irvin Barraclough" at britishnewspaperarchive.co.uk
Search for "Irvine Barraclough" at britishnewspaperarchive.co.uk
Search for "Irving Barraclough" at britishnewspaperarchive.co.uk

1927 births
2007 deaths
Castleford Tigers players
Doncaster R.L.F.C. players
English rugby league players
Featherstone Rovers players
Oldham R.L.F.C. players
People from Ackworth, West Yorkshire
Rugby league fullbacks
Rugby league players from Wakefield